The Cathedral of Our Lady, Shuozhou is the cathedral of Shuozhou in Shanxi, China.

History 
The Cathedral of Our Lady was originally built in 1913 with a Gothic architecture style. Since 1946, it was successively occupied by the He Long No.3 Middle School, Suimeng Military District and Shuo County Normal School.

The bell tower was smashed by the Red Guards during the ten-year Cultural Revolution. The Cathedral of Our Lady was returned to the church in 1996. Renovations and rebuilding to the cathedral began in 1998 and were completed in July 2000.

Architecture 
The Cathedral of Our Lady is located in the west and faces the east with a Gothic architecture style.

Gallery

References

Further reading 
 
 

Roman Catholic cathedrals in China
2000 establishments in China
Roman Catholic churches completed in 2000
Gothic Revival church buildings in China
Roman Catholic churches in Shanxi